The Security and Accountability For Every Port Act of 2006 (or SAFE Port Act) was an Act of Congress in the United States covering port security and to which an online gambling measure was added at the last moment.  The House and Senate passed the conference report on September 30, 2006, and President Bush signed the Act into law on October 13, 2006.

Port security provisions
The port security provisions were one of 20 bills introduced to Congress in the wake of the Dubai Ports World controversy that aimed to block Dubai Ports World acquiring P&O Ports, and more generally to stop key US ports falling into the hands of foreign owners by changing the Exon–Florio Amendment. The act codified into law a number of programs to improve security of U.S. ports, such as:

Additional requirements for maritime facilities
Creation of the Transportation Worker Identification Credential
Establishment of Interagency Operations Centers for port security
Port Security Grant Program
Container Security Initiative
Foreign port assessments
Customs Trade Partnership against Terrorism

In addition, the Act created the Domestic Nuclear Detection Office within the Department of Homeland Security and appropriated funds toward the Integrated Deepwater System Program, a long-term U.S. Coast Guard modernization program.

Internet gambling provisions

Title VIII of the Act is also known as the Unlawful Internet Gambling Enforcement Act of 2006 (or UIGEA).  This title (found at ) "prohibits gambling businesses from knowingly accepting payments in connection with the participation of another person in a bet or wager that involves the use of the Internet and that is unlawful under any federal or state law."  The Economist noted that the UIGEA provisions were "hastily tacked onto the end of unrelated legislation".

See also
Maritime Transportation Security Act of 2002
Port security
Transportation Worker Identification Credential

References

External links
 SAFE Port Act (PDF/details) as amended in the GPO Statute Compilations collection
 SAFE Port Act as enacted in the US Statutes at Large

Acts of the 109th United States Congress
United States federal gambling legislation
United States federal commerce legislation
United States federal criminal legislation
United States federal transportation legislation
United States federal defense and national security legislation